Curtis Staples (born July 14, 1976) is a former American basketball player who played from 1994 to 1998 for the University of Virginia. He was a sophomore starter on Virginia Group AAA champion Patrick Henry High School in 1992. He played at, and is a 1994 graduate of Oak Hill Academy in Mouth of Wilson, Virginia. He is best known for holding the all-time NCAA record for career three-point field goals, at 413.  His record stood for nearly eight years after his career ended until JJ Redick of Duke University broke it on February 14, 2006. Staples had actually conducted a basketball clinic in Virginia which Redick attended as a pre-teen; Redick's rare shooting ability caught Staples's eye even then.  Redick told The Roanoke Times, "I was a big Curtis Staples fan."

Staples attended the record-breaking game and remarked, "I've always said, like the old saying goes, records are meant to be broken. J.J. has been a hard worker and deserves everything that he gets. I'm glad to see somebody like J.J. breaking it. He's a very significant player that we will never forget." Staples played eight seasons of professional basketball overseas. He is now a basketball head coach for Virginia Episcopal School in Lynchburg, Virginia.

Staples broke the three point shooting record of Radford University's Doug Day, a native of Blacksburg, Virginia. 

The University of Virginia retired Staples' jersey (#5) on November 12, 2006 during halftime of Virginia's first game in its new John Paul Jones Arena.  Staples ranks ninth on Virginia's career scoring list with 1,757 points.

See also 
 List of NCAA Division I men's basketball season 3-point field goal leaders
 List of NCAA Division I men's basketball career 3-point scoring leaders

References

External links
D-League stats

1976 births
Living people
American expatriate basketball people in Italy
American expatriate basketball people in Spain
American men's basketball players
Basketball players from Virginia
High school basketball coaches in the United States
Huntsville Flight players
McDonald's High School All-Americans
Parade High School All-Americans (boys' basketball)
Roanoke Dazzle players
Virginia Cavaliers men's basketball players
Scafati Basket players
Shooting guards
Sportspeople from Roanoke, Virginia
Universiade gold medalists for the United States
Universiade medalists in basketball
Medalists at the 1997 Summer Universiade
Oak Hill Academy (Mouth of Wilson, Virginia) alumni